The Roman Catholic Diocese of Smolensk was a Latin Catholic diocese, founded in 1636 and dissolved in 1818, initially located in the Polish–Lithuanian Commonwealth, and later on, in Czarist Russia.

History 
The Roman Rite bishopric was established in 1611 by King Sigismund III Vasa. Its foundation was confirmed by the Sejm of the Polish–Lithuanian Commonwealth in 1618, however the first bishop Piotr Parczewski was appointed only in 1636. The see rather often served as a stepping stone to be transferred to other bishoprics in the Polish–Lithuanian Commonwealth. Initially, the territory of the diocese formed part of the Polish–Lithuanian Commonwealth, however, after the Truce of Andrusovo of 1667 it passed to Russia. Since then, the bishops of Smolensk resided in Warsaw.

On 15 April 1783, it lost much of its territory due to the establishment of the Metropolitan Archdiocese of Mohilev.

In 1818, it was suppressed and its territory merged into its Metropolitan and only daughter, the above Mohilev, which would be merged into the Diocese of Minsk and promoted to Metropolitan Archdiocese of Minsk-Mohilev at the dismemberment of the Soviet Union, so as to cover independent Belarus.

Episcopal ordinaries
(all Roman Rite)

Suffragan Bishops of Smolensk
 Piotr Parczewski (1636.09.01 – 1649.12.09), later Bishop of Samogitia (Lithuania) (1649.12.09 – death 1658.12.06)
 Franciszek Dołmat Isajkowski (1650.02.14 – death 1654.05)
 Hieronim Władysław Sanguszko, Jesuits (S.J.) (1655.05.31 – 1657.07); previously Titular Bishop of Modon (1644.12.12 – 1655.05.31) as Auxiliary Bishop of Vilnius (Lithuania) (1644.12.12 – 1655.05.31)
 Jerzy Białłozor (1658.03.18 – 1661.11.21), next Bishop of Vilnius (Lithuania) (1661.11.21 – death 1665.05.17)
 Kazimierz Pac (1664.01.14 – 1667.10.03), next Bishop of Samogitia (Lithuania) (1667.10.03 – death 1695)
 Gothard Jan Tyzenhaus (1668.09.17 – 1669), previously Titular Bishop of Modon (1661.04.05 – 1668.09.17) as Auxiliary Bishop of Vilnius (Lithuania) (1661.04.05 – 1668.09.17)
 Aleksander Kotowicz (1673.02.27 – 1685.04.09), next Bishop of Vilnius (Lithuania) (1685.04.09 – death 1686.11.30)
 Konstanty Kazimierz Brzostowski (1685.04.30 – 1687.11.24), next Bishop of Vilnius (Lithuania) (1687.11.24 – death 1722.10.24)
 Eustachy Stanisław Kazimierz Kotowicz (1688.05.17 – death 1704)
 Jan Mikołaj Zgierski (1706.01.25 – 1710.07.21); previously Titular Bishop of Martiria (1696.01.02 – 1706.01.25) as Auxiliary Bishop of Vilnius (Lithuania) (1696.01.02 – 1710.07.21); later Bishop of Samogitia (Lithuania) (1710.07.21 – death 1713.12.06)
 Aleksander Mikołaj Horain (1711.12.23 – 1716.12.07); previously Titular Bishop of Tiberias (1704.09.15 – 1711.12.23) as Auxiliary Bishop of Vilnius (Lithuania) (1704.09.15 – 1711.12.23); later Bishop of Samogitia (Lithuania) (1716.12.07 – death 1735.12.07)
 Ludwik Karol Ogiński (1717.11.22 – death 1718)
 Karol Piotr Pancerzyński (1721.09.24 – 1724.09.11); previously Titular Bishop of Hierapolis (1712.10.05 – 1721.09.24) as Auxiliary Bishop of Vilnius (Lithuania) (1712.10.05 – 1721.09.24), succeeded as Bishop of Vilnius (1724.09.11 – death 1729.02.19)

 Bogusław Korwin Gosiewski (1725.01.29 – death 1744.06.24), previously Titular Bishop of Achantus (1722.04.20 – 1725.01.29) as Auxiliary Bishop of Vilnius (Lithuania) (1722.04.20 – 1725.01.29)
 Jerzy Mikołaj Hylzen (1746.02.13 – 1763.07.17), died 1775
 Gabriel Wodzyński (1763.07.17 – death 1788.11.28), succeeded as previous Coadjutor Bishop of Smoleńsk (1759.04.04 – 1763.07.17) and Titular Bishop of Theveste (1759.04.04 – 1763.07.17)
 Adam Naruszewicz, S.J. (1788.11.28 – 1790.11.29), succeeding as previous Coadjutor Bishop of Smoleńsk (1775.03.13 – 1788.11.28) and Titular Bishop of Emmaus (1775.03.13 – 1788.11.28); later Bishop of Łuck (Poland) (1790.11.29 – death 1796.07.08)
 Tymoteusz Paweł Gorzeński (1790.11.29 – 1809.03.27), later Bishop of Poznań (Poland) ([1806.09.09] 1809.03.27 – 1821.07.16), Metropolitan Archbishop of Gniezno (Poland) and Poznań (Poland) (1821.07.16 – death 1825.12.20)

References

External links 
 GigaCatholic with incumbent biography links 

Former Roman Catholic dioceses in Ex-Soviet Europe
Roman Catholic dioceses and prelatures established in the 17th century
1636 establishments in the Polish–Lithuanian Commonwealth
1818 disestablishments in the Russian Empire
Former Roman Catholic dioceses in Poland
Suppressed Roman Catholic dioceses